Monoctenia smerintharia, more commonly known as the dark leaf moth, is a moth of the family Geometridae first described by Rudolf Felder and Alois Friedrich Rogenhofer in 1875. It is found in Australia. The larvae feed on the leaves of gum trees.

The adult moths are brown, sometimes with black smudges and scalloped submarginal lines on the forewings and a reddish shading on the hindwings. The wings have scalloped edges, and the forewing tips are recurved. The wingspan is about 6 centimeters. Its natural posture has the wings closed like a tent over the body, with the tip of the abdomen curved upward.

References

Oenochrominae
Taxa named by Alois Friedrich Rogenhofer